Neustadt an der Waldnaab is a Landkreis (district) in Bavaria, Germany. It is bounded by (from the south and clockwise) the districts of Schwandorf, Amberg-Sulzbach, Bayreuth and Tirschenreuth, and by the Czech Republic (Plzeň Region). The city of Weiden in der Oberpfalz is enclosed by, but does not belong to the district.

History 
The district was established in 1972 by merging the former districts of Neustadt an der Waldnaab, Eschenbach and Vohenstrauß.

Geography 
The district is located in the mountains of the Upper Palatine Forest (Oberpfälzer Wald). The two headstreams of the River Naab, the Waldnaab and Haidenaab, both run through the district to merge in the south of the area.

Coat of arms 
The coat of arms displays:
 the heraldic lion of the Palatinate
 three stars from the arms of the county of Störnstein
 blue and white bars from the arms of the county of Leuchtenberg

Towns and municipalities

References

External links 

  

 
Districts of Bavaria